Caesar Joseph L. Muere (born February 18, 1988), popularly known simply as C. J. Muere, is a former Filipino actor.  He is best known for being in the Final Four of StarStruck season two and portraying Ding in the 2005 television series of Darna. Before applying for GMA Network's StarStruck, he was a dropped from ABS-CBN's Star Circle Quest, which is also a reality television talent search show.

StarStruck
He auditioned in StarStruck in 2004 and he made it until the Top 7. He may be eliminated but through the Wild Card that was included in the season's format, he was selected, replacing Benj Pacia. He proved that he really deserved to be the wild card pick. He made it through to the coveted Final 4 along with LJ Reyes, Ryza Cenon and Mike Tan and wherein he finished as the runner up to Mike Tan.

StarStruck standing

 CJ got the highest point for that week.

Filmography
 Lovestruck
 Mars Ravelo's Darna
 Love to Love
 Ay, Robot!
 Now and Forever: Mukha
 SOP Gigsters
 StarStruck Season Two

Priority
Muere called a batch mate of his in StarStruck to tell that he formally said good bye to Ms. Ida Henares, to say good bye to show business.
Muere wants to study full-time and he is taking Dentistry at Centro Escolar University.
In March 2013, he graduated at Centro Escolar University with the degree of Doctor of Dental Medicine and passed the Dentistrt Licensure exam at the same year. He is currently taking his M.S. Orthodontics at Centro Escolar University Graduate School.

External links

References

1988 births
Filipino male child actors
Filipino male television actors
Filipino dentists
Living people
People from San Pablo, Laguna
Male actors from Laguna (province)
Participants in Philippine reality television series
StarStruck (Philippine TV series) participants
GMA Network personalities
Centro Escolar University alumni
Filipino male film actors